Daoura is a small town and rural commune in Tarfaya Province of the Laâyoune-Sakia El Hamra region of the Moroccan-controlled part of Western Sahara. At the time of the 2014 census, the commune had a total population of 1108 people.

References

Populated places in Laâyoune-Sakia El Hamra
Tarfaya
Populated places in Western Sahara